İstibulaq is a village in the Chaykend municipality of the Kalbajar District of Azerbaijan.

The village was occupied by the Armed Forces of Armenia in 1993 during the First Nagorno-Karabakh War. It was returned to Azerbaijan on 25 November 2020.

References 

Populated places in Kalbajar District